is a town located in Aomori Prefecture, Japan and a part of the Aomori metropolitan area. , the town had an estimated population of 4,990 in 2239 households, and a population density of 22 persons per km2.

Geography
Sotogahama is in Higashitsugaru District of Aomori Prefecture, and consists of two discontinuous geographic areas in northern Tsugaru Peninsula. The larger area is in the south, and consists of the former town of Kanita with a coastline on Mutsu Bay, and the former village of Tairadate in the centre of northern Tsugaru Peninsula. The smaller area is in the north, and consists of the former village of Minmaya with a coastline on the Tsugaru Strait. Much of the town is within the limits of the Tsugaru Quasi-National Park. Most of the settlements and arable land are located along the coastline, with about 89% of the total area of town as mountainous national forest.

Neighbouring municipalities
Aomori Prefecture
Goshogawara
Imabetsu
Nakadomari
Yomogita

Climate
The town has a cold humid continental climate (Köppen Cfb) characterized by warm short summers and long cold winters with heavy snowfall. The average annual temperature in Sotogahama is 10.0 °C. The average annual rainfall is 1267 mm with September as the wettest month. The temperatures are highest on average in August, at around 22.8 °C, and lowest in January, at around -1.8 °C.

Demographics
Per Japanese census data, the population of Sotogahama has decreased by more than half over the past 60 years and is now considerably less than it was a century ago.

History
The Tsugaru Peninsula has been inhabited since Japanese Paleolithic times, and some of the world's oldest pottery has been discovered at the Odai Yamamoto I site. The area around Sotogahama was controlled by the Tsugaru clan of Hirosaki Domain during the Edo period. During the post-Meiji restoration establishment of the modern municipalities system on April 1, 1889  Minmaya, Kanita and Tairadate villages were separated from Imabetsu. On March 28, 2005, these three municipalities merged to form the new town of Sotogahama.  Minmaya is a geographically discontinuous enclave from the town's center in Kanita.

Government
Sotogahama has a mayor-council form of government with a directly elected mayor and a unicameral town legislature of 11 members.  Higashitsugaru District contributes one member to the Aomori Prefectural Assembly. In terms of national politics, the town is part of Aomori 1st district of the lower house of the Diet of Japan.

Economy
The economy of Sotogahama is heavily dependent on commercial fishing. Some of the locally caught seafood include sea urchin roe, sea pineapple, sea cucumber, scallops, abalone and squid.

Education
Sotogahama has two public elementary schools and two public junior high schools operated by the town government. The town does not have a high school.

Transportation

Railway
 East Japan Railway Company (JR East) - Tsugaru Line
 Hokkaidō Railway Company (JR Hokkaido) - Kaikyō Line

Highway

Local attractions
Cape Tappi, the northwestern tip of Honshu
Tappizaki Lighthouse, one of the “50 Lighthouses of Japan” by the Japan Lighthouse Association. 
Odai Yamamoto I site, National Historic Site

Noted people from Sotogahama
Jackal Maruyama, boxer
Takuya Tazawa, nonfiction writer

References

External links
 

Towns in Aomori Prefecture
Populated coastal places in Japan
 
Aomori metropolitan area